Pension Towers is a building under construction in Kampala, the capital of Uganda and the largest city in that country.

Location
The skyscraper is located on Lumumba Avenue, on Nakasero Hill, an upscale neighborhood in Kampala (pop.1,507,080 in 2014), the capital and largest city in Uganda. The geographical coordinates of the building are: 0°19'15.0"N, 32°34'38.0"E (Latitude:0.320833; Longitude:32.577222).

Overview
Under construction since 2008, the office complex consists of three interconnected towers; one central tower of 25 stories in height, flanked on either side by a ten-story tower. Parking for over 500 vehicles will be provided in the development.

As of December 2021, the skyscraper which was approximately 70 percent complete, was valued at about USh300 billion (approx. US$85 million). It was the largest (both in size and value), single real-estate investment in the country, at that time.

History
National Social Security Fund (Uganda) (NSSF), currently maintains its headquarters in Workers House on Pilkington Avenue. In order to take advantage of the shortage of upscale commercial rental space in the city, NSSF began the construction of a headquarters complex in 2008. Initially the design called for a central tower of 25 stories, with matching 8 story towers on each side of the central building. In 2011, the design was changed, increasing the side towers to 10 stories each and modifying the architecture.

ROKO Construction Company, a Ugandan engineering and construction company, constructed the four basement floors between 2008 and 2012, but failed to qualify for further works on the project. Three Chinese firms were in a final bidding process to complete the construction.

In August 2018, Patrick Byabakama Kaberenge, the Chairman of NSSF, announced that the construction of phase 2 of the skyscraper had been awarded to China Railway Construction Engineering Group Company Limited. The height of the central tower had been increased to 32 storeys. Work on the second phase is expected to start before the end of 2018 and last about three years.

In February 2019, Ugandan print media reported that construction would resume in March 2019 with completion stated no later than May 2022. The main contractor would use own funds to construct the skyscraper, with NSSF paying at closing in 2022.

Construction costs
Phase I of the civil works, which was performed by ROKO Construction Company, cost UGX:42.5 billion. In August 2012, China Civil Engineering Construction Corporation (CCECC) was awarded the contract to complete the construction of the second phase of the project at a contract price of UGX:222.3 billion. This brings the total construction price to UGX:264.8 billion. During the 2018 Annual General Meeting, the NSSF chairman announced that construction of the second phase would cost US$110 million.

Controversy
In August 2012, it came to light that the selection of the contractor had contravened Uganda's procurement protocols. The winning bid was reported to be UGX:20 billion more expensive than the lowest bidder. The Inspector General of Government (IGG) stepped in and voided the award. An NSSF manager responsible for "procurement and disposal" was fired. In the meantime, the IGG has recommended that the whole tendering process be repeated and outsourced. The jostling for the way forward continues between NSSF, the IGG, and the government's Public Procurement Disposal of Public Assets Authority.

Recent developments
In September 2018, NSSF officials made public announcements that after a seven-year delay, work on the skyscraper would resume later the same year. A new contractor, China Railway Construction Engineering Group Company Limited, has been selected, at a new revised cost of US$110 million (approx. USh410 billion).

See also
 Banking in Uganda
 List of tallest buildings in Kampala
 Uganda Securities Exchange
 Kampala Capital City Authority
 Kampala Central Division

Photos and diagrams
Artist's Impression At Urbanlife.org

References

External links
 Website of National Social Security Fund Uganda

Buildings and structures under construction in Uganda
Buildings and structures in Kampala
Kampala Central Division